The European People's Party (EPP) is a European political party with Christian-democratic, conservative, and liberal-conservative member parties. A transnational organisation, it is composed of other political parties. Founded by primarily Christian-democratic parties in 1976, it has since broadened its membership to include liberal-conservative parties and parties with other centre-right political perspectives. On 31 May 2022, the party elected as its President Manfred Weber, who was also EPP's Spitzenkandidat in 2019.

The EPP has been the largest party in the European Parliament since 1999 and in the European Council since 2002. It is also the largest party in the current European Commission. The President of the European Commission Ursula von der Leyen and the President of the European Parliament Roberta Metsola are from the EPP. Many of the founding fathers of the European Union were also from parties that later formed the EPP. Outside the EU the party also controls a majority in the Parliamentary Assembly of the Council of Europe.

The EPP includes major centre-right parties such as the CDU/CSU of Germany, The Republicans of France, CD&V of Belgium, PNL of Romania, Fine Gael of Ireland, National Coalition Party of Finland, New Democracy of Greece, Forza Italia of Italy, the People's Party (PP) of Spain, the Civic Platform of Poland and the Social Democratic Party of Portugal.

History

According to its website, the EPP is "the family of the political centre-right, whose roots run deep in the history and civilisation of the European continent, and [which] has pioneered the European project from its inception".

The EPP was founded in Luxembourg on 8 July 1976 on the initiative of Jean Seitlinger; Leo Tindemans, then Prime Minister of Belgium, who became the first President of the EPP; and Wilfried Martens, who later became both President of the EPP and Prime Minister of Belgium. It had been preceded by the Secretariat International des partis démocratiques d'inspiration chrétienne, founded in 1925, the Nouvelles Equipes Internationales, founded in 1946 (or 1948), and the European Union of Christian Democrats, founded in 1965.

In the late 1990s, the Finnish politician Sauli Niinistö negotiated the merger of the European Democrat Union (EDU), of which he was president, into the EPP. In October 2002 the EDU ceased its activities after being formally absorbed by the EPP at a special event in Estoril, Portugal. In recognition of his efforts, Niinistö was elected Honorary President of the EPP the same year.

The EPP has had seven Presidents:

Platform and manifesto

Political manifesto and platform
During its Congress in Bucharest in 2012, the EPP updated its political platform after 20 years (since its Congress in Athens in 1992) and approved a political manifesto in which it summarised its main values and policies.

The manifesto highlights:
 Freedom as a central human right, coupled with responsibility
 Respect for traditions and associations
 Solidarity to help those in need, who in turn should also make an effort to improve their situation
 Ensuring solid public finances
 Preserving a healthy environment
 Subsidiarity
 Pluralist democracy and a social market economy

The manifesto also describes the EPP's priorities for the EU, including:
 European Political Union
 Direct election of the President of the European Commission
 Completion of the European Single Market
 Promotion of the family, improvements in education and health
 Strengthening of the common immigration and asylum policy, and integrating immigrants
 Continuation of enlargement of the EU, enhancement of the European Neighbourhood Policy and special relationship frameworks for countries that cannot, or do not want to, join the EU
 Defining a truly common EU energy policy
 Strengthening European political parties

Electoral manifesto
As a central part of its campaign for the European elections in 2009, the EPP approved its election manifesto at its Congress in Warsaw in April that year. The manifesto called for:
 Creation of new jobs, continuing reforms and investment in education, lifelong learning, and employment to create opportunities for everyone.
Avoidance of protectionism, and coordination of fiscal and monetary policies.
Increased transparency and surveillance in financial markets.
Making Europe the market leader in green technology.
Increasing the share of renewable energy to at least 20 percent of the energy mix by 2020.
Family-friendly flexibility for working parents, better child care and housing, family-friendly fiscal policies, encouragement of parental leave.
A new strategy to attract skilled workers from the rest of the world to make Europe's economy more competitive, more dynamic and more knowledge-driven.

The Fidesz crisis
Concerns that the Hungarian ruling party Fidesz and its leader Viktor Orbán were undermining the rule of law in Hungary caused a split in the EPP in the run-up of the 2019 European Parliament election. On one hand, the EPP had been reluctant for years to address Fidesz's stance against the rule of law, expressed by the Article 7 proceedings of the European Parliament. On the other hand, European Commission President Jean-Claude Juncker, a prominent EPP-member, stated "I believe his [Fidesz's] place is not in the European People's Party". Orbán's campaigns targeting billionaire George Soros and Jean-Claude Juncker carried wide reverberations for Europe questioning the EPP's effort to install its lead candidate Manfred Weber as the next President of the European Commission.

After years of deferring a decision about the Fidesz issue, the EPP was eventually compelled to address the problem two months before the 2019 European elections, as 13 outraged member parties requested the Hungarian party's exclusion from the EPP due to its billboard campaign featuring Jean-Claude Juncker. 190 of the 193 EPP delegates supported the common agreement with Fidesz on 20 March 2019 to partially suspend its membership. According to it, Fidesz was "until further notice" excluded from EPP meetings and internal elections, but remained in the European People's Party Group of the European Parliament. Fidesz did not deliver on its earlier promise to leave the EPP in case of a penalty.

In February 2020, the EPP extended the suspension of Fidesz indefinitely.

On 2 April 2020, thirteen parties within the EPP issued a joint statement aimed at Donald Tusk, asking him to expunge Fidesz from the party. Three days before this, the Hungarian Parliament had passed a law, declaring a state of emergency within Hungary, granting Prime Minister Viktor Orbán the right to rule by decree.

On 3 March 2021, Prime Minister Viktor Orbán announced that Fidesz would leave the EPP group after it changed its internal rules (to allow suspension and expulsion of multiple deputies and their groups), although Fidesz remained a suspended member of the EPP itself. On 18 March 2021, Fidesz decided to leave the European People's Party.

Membership 

Within the EPP there are three kinds of member organisations: full members, associate members and observers. Full members are parties from EU states. They have absolute rights to vote in all the EPP's organs and on all matters. Associate members have the same voting rights as full members except for matters concerning the EU's structure or policies. These associate members are parties from EU candidate countries and EFTA countries. Observer parties can participate in all the activities of the EPP, and attend the Congresses and Political Assemblies, but they do not have any voting rights.

Special status of "supporting member" is granted by the Presidency to individuals and associations. Although they do not have voting rights, they can be invited by the President to attend meetings of certain organs of the party.

Full member parties

Associate members 

 Democratic Party of Albania(PD)

 Internal Macedonian Revolutionary Organization – Democratic Party for Macedonian National Unity (VMRO–DPMNE)

 Conservative Party (H)

 Serbian Progressive Party (SNS)
 Alliance of Vojvodina Hungarians (VMSZ/SVM)

 The Centre

Observer members 

 Republican Party of Armenia (HHK)
 Rule of Law (OEK)
 Heritage

 Belarusian Christian Democracy (BCD)
 United Civic Party of Belarus (AHP)
  (The Movement for Freedom; MFF)

 Party of Democratic Action (SDA)
 Croatian Democratic Union (HDZ BiH)
 Party of Democratic Progress (PDP)
 Croatian Democratic Union 1990 (HDZ 1990)

 United National Movement (UNM)
 European Georgia

Democratic League of Kosovo (LDK)

 Liberal Democratic Party of Moldova (PLDM)
 Dignity and Truth Platform Party (PPDA)
 Party of Action and Solidarity (PAS)

 Democratic Montenegro (DCG)
 Bosniak Party (BS)

 Christian People's Party (KrF)

 Sammarinese Christian Democratic Party (PDCS)

 Democratic Alliance
 European Solidarity
 Batkivshchyna (since 2008)
 Self Reliance (since 2019)
 Ukrainian Democratic Alliance for Reform (UDAR)

Former members 

 Belarusian Popular Front (BNF), observer member until 2017

 Centre of Social Democrats
 Union for French Democracy
 Rally for the Republic
 Union for a Popular Movement

 Croatian Peasant Party (HSS), member until withdrawal May 2019.

 Fidesz, suspended from March 20, 2019. Left EPP on March 18, 2021.
Hungarian Democratic Forum, member until 07.09.2009 

 Christian Democracy
 Italian People's Party
 Christian Democratic Centre
 United Christian Democrats
 Italian Renewal
 Forza Italia
 Union of Democrats for Europe
 The People of Freedom
 New Centre-Right

 Democratic Party (PD)
 Democratic Liberal Party (PDL)
 Christian Democratic National Peasants' Party (PNȚ-CD)

 Slovak Democratic and Christian Union – Democratic Party (SDKÚ-DS)
 Most-Híd
 Party of the Hungarian Community

 Basque Nationalist Party
 People's Democratic Party

 Justice and Development Party (observer)

 People's Movement of Ukraine (observer)
 Our Ukraine (observer)

 Conservative Party (European Democrats subgroup)

Governance
The EPP is governed by the EU Regulation No 1141/2014 on European Political Parties and European Political Foundations and its operations are supervised by the EU Authority for European Political Parties and European Political Foundations.

Presidency
The Presidency is the executive body of the party. It decides on the general political guidelines of the EPP and presides over its Political Assembly. The Presidency is composed of the President, ten Vice-Presidents, the Honorary Presidents, the Secretary General and the Treasurer. The Chairperson of the EPP Group in the European Parliament, the Presidents of the Commission, the Parliament and the Council, and the High Representative (if they are a member of an EPP member party) are all ex officio Vice-Presidents.

As of 1 June 2022 the Presidency of the EPP is (Vice Presidents in the order of votes received at the EPP Congress in Rotterdam):

 Manfred Weber – President (MEP, also EPP Group Chairman, 2019 EPP Spitzenkandidat)
 Thanasis Bakolas – Secretary General
 Mariya Gabriel – Vice President (EU Commissioner)
 Esther de Lange – Vice President (MEP)
 Johannes Hahn – Vice President (EU Commissioner)
 Siegfried Mureșan – Vice President (MEP)
 Dubravka Šuica – Vice President (EU Commissioner)
 Petteri Orpo – Vice President (Leader of Kokoomus, former Finance Minister)
 David McAllister – Vice President (MEP, former Minister-President)
 Andrzej Halicki – Vice President (MEP)
 Antonio Tajani – Vice President (MEP, former European Parliament President, former Commission Vice President)
 Esteban González Pons – Vice President (MEP)
 Paulo Rangel – Treasurer (MEP)
 Ursula von der Leyen – Ex officio Vice-President (President of the European Commission) 
 Roberta Metsola – Ex officio Vice-President (President of the European Parliament) 
 Sauli Niinistö – Honorary President (President of Finland)

EPP Political Assembly
The Political Assembly defines the political positions of the EPP between Congresses and decides on membership applications, political guidelines and the budget. The Political Assembly is composed of designated delegates from EPP member parties, associated parties, member associations, and other affiliated groups. The Political Assembly meets at least three times a year.

Congress
The Congress is the highest decision-making body of the EPP. It is composed of delegates from member parties, EPP associations, EPP Group MEPs, the EPP Presidency, national heads of party and government, and European Commissioners who belong to a member party, with the numbers of delegates being weighted according to the EPP's share of MEPs, and individual delegates being elected by member parties according to member parties' rules.

Under the EPP's statutes, the Congress must meet once every three years, but it also meets normally during the years of elections for the European Parliament (every five years), and extraordinary Congresses have also been summoned. The Congress elects the EPP Presidency every three years, decides on the main policy documents and electoral programmes, and provides a platform for the EPP's heads of government and party leaders.

Activities within the party

Summit
EPP leaders meet for the EPP Summit a few hours before each meeting of the European Council in order to formulate common positions. Invitations are sent by the EPP President and attendees include, besides the members of the EPP's presidency, all Presidents and Prime Ministers who are members of the European Council and belong to the EPP; the Presidents of the European Parliament, the European Commission and the European Council, as well as the High Representative for Foreign Affairs, provided that they belong to the EPP; Deputy Prime Ministers or other ministers in those cases where the Prime Minister of a country does not belong to an EPP member party; and, where no EPP member party is part of a government, the leaders of the main EPP opposition party.

Ministerial meetings
Following the pattern of the EPP Summit the party also organises regular EPP Ministerial meetings before each meeting of the Council of the European Union, with ministers, deputy ministers, secretaries of state and MEPs in the specific policy field attending:
 General Affairs
 Foreign Affairs
 Economy and Finance
 Home Affairs
 Justice
 Defence
 Employment and Social Affairs
 Industry
 Agriculture
 Energy
 Environment

Other activities
The EPP also organises working groups on different issues on an ad hoc basis, as well as meetings with its affiliated members in the European Commission. It also invites individual Commissioners to the EPP Summit meetings and to EPP Ministerial meetings.

Following amendments to the EU Regulation that governs europarties in 2007, the EPP, like the other European political parties, is responsible for organising a pan-European campaign for the European elections every five years. According to the Lisbon Treaty, the parties must present candidates for President of the European Commission, but the EPP had already done this by endorsing José Manuel Barroso for a second term in April 2009.

The year 2014 saw the first fully-fledged campaign of the EPP ahead of the European elections of that year. The party nominated former Luxembourgish Prime Minister Jean-Claude Juncker as its candidate for President of the European Commission and led a pan-European campaign in coordination with the national campaigns of all its member parties.

Activities within EU institutions 
As of December 2019, the EPP will hold the Presidency of the European Commission with Ursula von der Leyen (CDU).

Overview of the Union's institutions

European Commission
Following EPP's victory in the 2019 European Parliament election, Ursula von der Leyen was nominated by the EPP as Commission President. She was endorsed by the European Council and elected by an absolute majority in the European Parliament. On 1 December 2019, the von der Leyen Commission officially took office. It includes 10 EPP officeholders out of 27 total Commissioners.

European Parliament

The EPP has the largest group in the European Parliament: the EPP Group. It currently has 182 Members in the European Parliament and its chairman is the German MEP Manfred Weber.

In every election for the European Parliament candidates elected on lists of member parties of the EPP are obliged to join the EPP Group in the European Parliament.

The EPP Group holds five of the fourteen vice-presidencies of the European Parliament.

European Council
The EPP has 10 out of the 27 EU heads of state or government attending the EPP summit meetings in preparation of the European Council (as of October 2021):

National legislatures

Activities beyond the European Union

In third countries
Through its associate and observer parties the EPP has five head of state or government in non-EU countries:

In the Council of Europe
The Group of the EPP in the Parliamentary Assembly of the Council of Europe defends freedom of expression and information, as well as freedom of movement of ideas and religious tolerance. It promotes the principle of subsidiarity and local autonomy, as well as the defence of national, social, and other minorities. The EPP/CD Group is led by Aleksander Pociej, a member of the Polish Civic Platform.

The EPP/CD group also includes members from parties that are not related to the EPP itself, including members of the Patriotic Union (Liechtenstein), the Progressive Citizens' Party (Liechtenstein), and the National and Democratic Union (Monaco).

In the Organization for Security and Co-operation in Europe
The "EPP and like-minded Group" in the Parliamentary Assembly of the Organization for Security and Co-operation in Europe (OSCE) is the most active political group in that body. The Group meets regularly and promotes the EPP's positions. The members of the EPP Group also participate in the election-monitoring missions of the OSCE.

The Group is chaired by Walburga Habsburg Douglas (Sweden), and its Vice-Presidents are Consiglio Di Nino (Canada), Vilija Aleknaitė Abramikiene (Lithuania), Laura Allegrini (Italy), and George Tsereteli (Georgia).

The Group also includes members of parties not related to the EPP, accounting for the "like-minded" part of its name. Among them are members of the Patriotic Union (Liechtenstein), the Union for the Principality (Monaco), the Conservative Party of the United Kingdom, the Conservative Party of Canada, and the Republican Party of the United States.

In the North Atlantic Treaty Organization
The EPP is also present and active in the Parliamentary Assembly of the North Atlantic Treaty Organization (NATO), and forms the "EPP and Associated Members" Group there. It is led by the German CDU politician Karl Lamers, who is also the current President of the Assembly. The Group also included members of the Conservative Party of Canada and the Republican Party of the United States, but now they're members of the Conservative Group

Relations with the United States
The EPP has close relations with the International Republican Institute (IRI), an organisation funded by the U.S. government especially to promote democracy and democratisation. The EPP and the IRI cooperate within the framework of the European Partnership Initiative.

The EPP's late President, Wilfried Martens, endorsed Senator John McCain, the Republican nominee for president, in the presidential election in 2008. McCain was also Chairman of the IRI. In 2011 Martens and McCain made joint press statements expressing their concern about the state of democracy in Ukraine.

Global networks
The EPP is the European wing of two global centre-right organisations, the International Democrat Union (IDU) and the Christian Democrat International (CDI).

Martens Centre 

Following the revision in 2007 of the EU Regulation that governs European political parties, allowing the creation of European foundations affiliated to Europarties, the EPP established in the same year its official foundation/think tank, the Centre for European Studies (CES), which was later renamed as the Martens Centre. It includes as members all the major national think tanks and foundations affiliated to EPP member parties: the Konrad Adenauer Foundation (CDU), the Hanns Seidel Foundation (CSU), the Foundation for Analysis and Social Studies (PP), the Constantinos Karamanlis Institute for Democracy (ND), the Jarl Hjalmarson Foundation (MOD), the Political Academy of the Austrian People's Party (ÖVP) and others. During the European Parliament election campaign in 2009, the Centre launched a web-based campaign module, tellbarroso.eu, to support Jose Manuel Barroso, the EPP's candidate for re-election as Commission President.

In 2014, to honour Wilfried Martens – the late President of the EPP who also founded the CES – changed its name to Wilfried Martens Centre for European Studies or simply Martens Centre.

The current President of the Martens Centre is former Slovak Prime Minister Mikuláš Dzurinda.

The Budapest-based Robert Schuman Institute and the Luxembourg-based Robert Schuman Foundation are also affiliated with the European People's Party.

EPP associations 

The EPP is linked to several specific associations that focus on specific groups and organise seminars, forums, publications, and other activities.

Small and Medium Entrepreneurs Europe (SME Europe)

SME Europe is the official business organisation of the EPP and serves as a network for pro-business politicians and political organisations. Its main objective is to shape EU policy in a more SME-friendly way in close cooperation with the SME Circle of the EPP Group in the European Parliament, the DG Enterprise and the pro-business organisations of the EPP's member parties. Its top priorities are to reform the legal framework for SMEs all over Europe and to promote and support the interests of small and medium-sized enterprises. SME Europe was founded in May 2012 by three Members of the European Parliament, Paul Rübig, Nadezhda Neynsky, and Bendt Bendtsen.

European Democrat Students

European Democrat Students (EDS) is now the official students' organisation of the EPP, though it was founded in 1961, 15 years before the EPP itself. Led by Virgilio Falco, EDS has 40 member organisations, representing nearly 1,600,000 students and young people in 31 countries, including Belarus and Georgia. Every year EDS hosts Summer and Winter "universities", and several seminars. It also regularly publishes a magazine, Bullseye, and organises topical campaigns.

European Seniors' Union
Founded in Madrid in 1995 and led by Ann Hermans of the CD&V, the European Seniors' Union (ESU) is the largest political senior citizens' organisation in Europe. The ESU is represented in 26 states with 45 organisations and about 500,000 members.

European Union of Christian Democratic Workers
The European Union of Christian Democratic Workers (EUCDW) is the labour organisation of the EPP, with 24 member organisations in 18 countries. As the officially recognised EPP association of workers, the EUCDW is led by Elmar Brok, MEP. It aims at the political unification of a democratic Europe, the development of the EPP based on Christian social teaching, and the defence of workers' interests in European policy-making.

Women of the European People's Party
The Women of the European People's Party (EPP Women) is recognised by the EPP as the official association of women from all like-minded political parties of Europe. EPP Women has more than 40 member organisations from countries of the European Union and beyond. All of them are women's organisations of political parties that are members of the EPP. EPP Women is led by Doris Pack.

Youth of the European People's Party

The Youth of the European People's Party (YEPP), led by Lídia Pereira, is the EPP's official youth organisation. It has 64 member organisations, bringing together between one and two million young people in 40 countries.

Notes

References

Bibliography 

 
Herman, L., Hoerner, J., & Lacey, J. (2021). "Why does the European Right accommodate backsliding states? An analysis of 24 European People's Party votes (2011–2019)." European Political Science Review

External links 

 
Martens Centre the EPP think-tank
EPP Group in the European Parliament
EPP Group in the Committee of the Regions 
EPP Group in the Parliamentary Assembly of the Council of Europe
EPP Youth (YEPP)
EPP Students (EDS)
EPP Women
EPP Seniors (ESU)
EPP SME Union
EPP Workers (EUCDW)

 
Political parties established in 1976
Pan-European political parties
Centre-right parties in Europe
Conservative parties in Europe
Christian democratic parties in Europe
Liberal conservative parties
European Union and the Catholic Church
International Democrat Union
1976 establishments in Europe